The 1952 Kansas State Wildcats football team represented Kansas State University in the 1952 college football season. The team's head football coach was Bill Meek, in his second year at the helm of the Wildcats. The Wildcats played their home games in Memorial Stadium. The Wildcats finished the season with a 1–9 record with a 0–6 record in conference play. They finished in last place in the Big Seven Conference for the fifth consecutive year. The Wildcats scored just 81 points and gave up 255 points.

Schedule

References

Kansas State
Kansas State Wildcats football seasons
Kansas State Wildcats football